Yeniyol (Turkic: "new road"), also spelled or Yeniyël or Yeniyel, may refer to:

 Yeniyol, Azerbaijan (disambiguation), several places
 Yeniyol, Kelkit, Turkey
 Yeniyol, Beşiri, Turkey
 Yeniyel, Azerbaijan
 Aghvorik, Armenia

See also  
 Yeni yol (disambiguation)